The 14th Chess Olympiad, organized by FIDE and comprising an open team tournament, as well as several other events designed to promote the game of chess, took place between October 26 and November 9, 1960, in Leipzig, East Germany.

The Soviet team with six grandmasters, led by world champion Mikhail Tal, lived up to expectations and won their fifth consecutive gold medals, with the United States and Yugoslavia taking the silver and bronze, respectively. In a reversal of fortune from the previous Olympiad, the East German hosts finished 9th, right behind rivals West Germany. Unlike the last time, however, the match between the two was a tight affair that ended in a 2–2 draw.

Results

Preliminaries

A total of 40 teams entered the competition and were divided into four preliminary groups of 10 teams each. The top three from each group advanced to Final A, the teams placed 4th–6th to Final B, and the rest to Final C. All preliminary groups as well as Finals A and B were played as round-robin tournaments, while Final C with 16 teams was played as an 11-round Swiss system tournament.

Group 1 was won by Bulgaria, ahead of Yugoslavia and the host nation. Norway, Finland, and Israel took the places 4–6, while Indonesia, France, Albania, and Malta finished at the bottom of the group.

The Soviet Union took first place in group 2, well ahead of Argentina and the Netherlands. Poland, Austria, and India made up the middle part of the group, while Portugal, the Philippines, Italy, and Monaco had to settle for the bottom.

Group 3 was won by England, ahead of Czechoslovakia and Hungary. The three Nordic nations Sweden, Denmark, and Iceland had to settle for Final B. Meanwhile, Mongolia, Tunisia, Greece, and Bolivia finished at the bottom of the group.

The United States clinched group 4, ahead of West Germany and Romania. Spain, Chile, and Cuba made up the middle part of the group, while Belgium, Ecuador, Ireland, and Lebanon completed the field.

 Group 1: 

 Group 2: 

 Group 3: 

 Group 4:

Final

{| class="wikitable"
|+ Final A
! # !!Country !! Players !! Points !! MP
|-
| style="background:gold;"|1 ||  || Tal, Botvinnik, Keres, Korchnoi, Smyslov, Petrosian || 34 || 
|-
| style="background:silver;"|2 ||  || Fischer, Lombardy, Byrne, Bisguier, Rossolimo, Weinstein || 29 || 
|-
| style="background:#cc9966;"|3 ||  || Gligorić, Matanović, Ivkov, Bertok, Damjanović, Vukčević || 27 || 
|-
| 4 ||  || Szabó, Portisch, Barcza, Bilek, Lengyel, Kluger, || 22½ || 
|-
| 5 ||  || Pachman, Filip, Fichtl, Hort, Kozma, Ujtelky || 21½ || 
|-
| 6 ||  || Bobotsov, Padevsky, Neikirch, Kolarov, Minev, Milev || 21 || 
|-
| 7 ||  || Najdorf, Eliskases, Wexler, Bazán, Schweber, Foguelman || 20½ || 
|-
| 8 ||  || Unzicker, Schmid, Darga, Lehmann, Bialas, Pfeiffer || 19½ || 
|-
| 9 ||  || Uhlmann, Pietzsch, Malich, Dittmann, Fuchs, Golz || 19 || 
|-
| 10 ||  || Euwe, Donner, Bouwmeester, Prins, Kramer, Langeweg || 17 || 
|-
| 11 ||  || Ghițescu, Drimer, Radovici, Mititelu, Troianescu, Szabó || 16½ || 7
|-
| 12 ||  || Penrose, Golombek, Clarke, Haygarth, Barden, Wade || 16½ || 4
|-
|}

{| class="wikitable"
|+ Final B
! # !! Country !! Players !! Points !! MP !! HTH
|-
| 13 ||  || Ståhlberg, Lundin, Johansson, Nilsson, Sköld, Buskenström || 27½ ||  || 
|-
| 14 ||  || Porat, Czerniak, Aloni, Persitz, Kraidman, Guthi || 26½ ||  || 
|-
| 15 ||  || Robatsch, Beni, Lokvenc, Janetschek, Kaliwoda, Groiss || 24½ ||  || 
|-
| 16 ||  || Nielsen, Kølvig, Holm, Blom, Jensen, From || 23½ || 13 || 3
|-
| 17 ||  || Ojanen, Böök, Rantanen, Räisä, Fred, Niemelä || 23½ || 13 || 1
|-
| 18 ||  || Jiménez, Cobo, Gonzáles, García, De Cardenas || 23 || 11 || 
|-
| 19 ||  || Johannessen, de Lange, Lindblom, Hoen, Svenneby, Myhre || 23 || 10 || 
|-
| 20 ||  || Pérez, Pomar, Torán, Mallofré, del Corral, Pulido || 22½ ||  || 
|-
| 21 ||  || Śliwa, Plater, Tarnowski, Doda, Kostro, Filipowicz || 22 ||  || 
|-
| 22 ||  || Letelier, Cadaiz, Hausman, Romo, Rojas || 19½ ||  || 
|-
| 23 ||  || Thorbergsson, Guðmundsson, Gunnarsson, Magnússon, Sólmundarson, Lárusson || 16½ ||  || 
|-
| 24 ||  || Aaron, Sapre, Wahi, Seth || 12 ||  || 
|}

{| class="wikitable"
|+ Final C
! # !! Country !! Players !! Points !! MP
|-
| 25 ||  || Campomanes, Borja, Naranja, Reyes, De Castro, Villanueva, Avecilla || 28½ || 
|-
| 26 ||  || Wotulo, Bachtiar, Baswedan, Tan, Panggabean || 27½ || 17
|-
| 27 ||  || Namzhil, Möömöö, Chalkhasuren, Myagmarsuren, Baldandorsh, Badamgarav G. || 27½ || 15
|-
| 28 ||  || Pustina, Hoxha, Konçi, Veizaj, Omari || 26½ || 
|-
| 29 ||  || Muñoz, Aguirre, Morales, Yépez, Garcés, Klein || 26 || 
|-
| 30 ||  || Durão, Ribeiro, Gonçalves, De Oliveira, Rocha, Cardoso || 25 || 15
|-
| 31 ||  || Boutteville, Noradounguian, Bergraser, Casa, Linais, Cormier || 25 || 13
|-
| 32 ||  || Contedini, Tamburini, Palmiotto, Magrin, Mercuri || 24 || 
|-
| 33 ||  || O'Kelly, Thibaut, Dunkelblum, Van Schoor, Franck, Blockx || 23½ || 
|-
| 34 ||  || Belkadi, Lagha, Kahia, Mohsen, Kchouk, Ben Cheik || 21½ || 
|-
| 35 ||  || Anastasopoulos, Angos, Papapostolou, Paidousis, Kapralos || 20½ || 
|-
| 36 ||  || Humerez, Villegas, Mendivil, Salazar, Soruco || 19½ || 
|-
| 37 ||  || Kostjoerin, Fauconnier, Perrottey, d'Auriac, Renoy-Chevrier, Deslauriers J. || 17½ || 
|-
| 38 ||  || Reilly, Littleton, O'Hare, Nash, Cassidy || 17 || 
|-
| 39 ||  || Camilleri, Soler, Gouder, Fenech, Cuschieri, Dingli || 14 || 
|-
| 40 ||  || Chalabi, Salameh, Gabriel, Galeb, Tarazi, Batlouni, Allam || 8½ || 
|}

Final A

Final B

Final C

Individual medals

 Board 1:  Karl Robatsch 13½ / 16 = 84.4%
 Board 2:  Mikhail Botvinnik 10½ / 13 = 80.8%
 Board 3:  Paul Keres 10½ / 13 = 80.8%
 Board 4:  Lhamsuren Myagmarsuren and  Tan Hoan Liong 16½ / 20 = 82.5%
 1st reserve:  Vassily Smyslov 11½ / 13 = 88.5%
 2nd reserve:  Tigran Petrosian 12 / 13 = 92.3%

References

14th Chess Olympiad: Leipzig 1960 OlimpBase
(alternative link when site is down)

14
Olympiad 14
Chess Olympiad 14
Olympiad 14
Chess Olympiad 14
Chess in East Germany